The Genesee Tunnel is an underground water pipeline operated by the South Central Connecticut Regional Water Authority (formerly the New Haven Water Company), part of the Authority's source water distribution system.

The tunnel runs partly across a section of RWA land known as the Genesee Recreation area, located northwest of the intersection of Route 79 and Route 80, which is covered by 9 miles of hiking trails and is the site of the historic "Little Genesee Settlement." The Genesee Recreation area is accessible for hiking and fishing to anyone with an RWA Recreation Permit.

References

External links
South Central Connecticut Regional Water Authority

Water tunnels in the United States
Tunnels in Connecticut
Transportation buildings and structures in New Haven County, Connecticut
Transportation buildings and structures in Middlesex County, Connecticut